Konigovo (Konig) is a rural locality (a village) in Shudeksky Selsoviet, Yanaulsky District, Bashkortostan, Russia. The population was 142 as of 2010. There is 1 street.

Geography 
Konigovo is located 7 km southwest of Yanaul (the district's administrative centre) by road. Shudek is the nearest rural locality.

References 

Rural localities in Yanaulsky District